The 2013 Laser Radial World Championships for Men were held in Dún Laoghaire, Ireland between August 30 and September 6, 2013.

Results

External links
Official website
Results

Laser Radial World Championships
Men's Laser Radial World Championship
Sailing competitions in Ireland